Kuluban is a traditional salad of Central Java. Kuluban can be consumed on its own as a salad for vegetarian meals or as a side dish. Kuluban is one of ancient Javanese cuisine, as it was mentioned in inscription dated from Medang Mataram era circa 9th century CE.

Ingredients
The vegetables which are usually used in Kuluban are string bean, petai, young jackfruit, orange leaf, bean sprouts, kencur, terasi, shredded young coconut, red pepper, salt, sugar. To acquire crispy texture, most recipes insist on adding kerupuk.

See also

 Lawar, a Balinese version of urap
 Gado-gado
 Karedok
 List of salads
 Pecel
 Urap

References

External links
 Kuluban recipe from Original Indonesian recipe

Salads
Vegetable dishes of Indonesia
Vegetarian dishes of Indonesia